X-Men: Children of the Atom may refer to:
 X-Men: Children of the Atom (video game), a 1994 fighting game
 X-Men: Children of the Atom (comics), a 1999 comic book series
 Children of the Atom (comics), a 2021 comic book series
 Children of the Atom, a mutant-related sourcebook for the Marvel Super Heroes role-playing game

See also
 Children of the Atom, novel by Wilmar Shiras